The Lonnie A. Pope House in Douglas, Georgia is a Barber & Kluttz-designed historic house built in 1910.  It was listed on the National Register of Historic Places in 1982.  It is located at Jackson St. and Douglas Trail (which formerly was the Central of Georgia Railroad tracks).

In 1982 it was deemed "an outstanding example of the Queen Anne style of architecture" and was asserted to be one of few houses designed in that style in Southeast Georgia.  Its interior is also high-style Queen Anne.  The house is interesting for having signed architectural plans in existence.

The house was vacant in 1980.

Notes

References

External links

Houses on the National Register of Historic Places in Georgia (U.S. state)
Queen Anne architecture in Georgia (U.S. state)
Houses completed in 1910
Coffee County, Georgia